Dabolim Assembly constituency is one of the 40 Goa Legislative Assembly constituencies of the state of Goa in southern India. Dabolim is also one of the 20 constituencies falling under the South Goa Lok Sabha constituency.

Members of Legislative Assembly
 1977: Shankar Vishveswar Laad, Maharashtrawadi Gomantak Party
 1980: Luis Dourado Herculano, Indian National Congress (Urs)
 1984: Simon Peter D'Souza, Indian National Congress

Election results

2022 result

2017 result

See also
 List of constituencies of the Goa Legislative Assembly
 South Goa district

References

External links
  

South Goa district
Assembly constituencies of Goa